Robinson algorithm may refer to:
Robinson's Resolution Algorithm
Robinson–Schensted correspondence
Robinson's unification algorithm